The Coupe de France's results of the 2006–07 season. 6577 clubs participated in the cup and the final was played on May 12.

The cup winner qualified for UEFA Cup qualification.

Round of 64

*  - Extra time
**  - Penalty shootout
***  - Bois-Guillaume won administratively (A suspended player took part to the match)

Round of 32

*  - Extra time
** - Penalty shootout

Round of 16

*  - Extra time
**  - Penalty shootout

Quarter-finals

** - Penalty shootout

Semi-finals

* - Extra time

Final

Topscorer
Djibril Cissé (7 goals)

References

 
2006–07 in French football
2006-07